Marina Rae Sargenti (born July 21, 1947) is an American director, writer, and producer. Sargenti's first film was the 1990 horror film Mirror, Mirror, which she co-wrote. She later directed several episodes of Models Inc. (1994–95), Malibu Shores (1996), and the television film Lying Eyes (1996).

Filmography

References

External links

1947 births
Living people
American women film directors
Film directors from Los Angeles
21st-century American women